Open Gate – Grammar and Primary  School is  a private school, located in the hamlet  of Babice outside Prague, comprising both Primary and Grammar schools, the latter offering boarding facilities for the students during their eight year course of study.

The campus first saw light in 2005 under the financial support of the  foundation named Nadace Educa, which in the year 2011 was amalgamated with The Kellner Family Foundation of Renáta and Petr Kellner.  The current Headmaster of the School is Petr Šlemenda with Luděk Michalík as a deputy.

History
 2005: The Grammar School founded, with first students entering in the year 2005/2006.,
 2009: Granted international accreditation allowing school to offer the International Baccalaureate Diploma programme  (more commonly known as the I.B.).
 2011: The Primary School opened for classes 1 through 5 (First Level Primary education), its programme giving it Czech-English Primary School status.
 2012: The new Primary School buildings with attendant multi-functional sports’ hall completed in the campus of Open Gate.

Location
The Open Gate campus in Babice comprises a total of 7 hectares and its final construction costs came to 250 million Kč. The campus consists of the school and boarding facilities, library,  theater, rural studies area including stables, the sports’ hall, swimming pool, all-weather outdoor multi-use sports’ ground and the refectory. As a matter of course school uniform is worn throughout the school day and on all activities or visits outside the Open Gate grounds.

The Grammar  School
At the end of their studies at Open Gate, the students have the opportunity to sit for International Baccalaureate Diploma qualification, or the State Maturita. In reality the great majority of students sit for both. From year five (kvinta) education is delivered through the medium of the English language across the curriculum; an exception being Czech and Czech realia.

The application process for entry to the Grammar School includes a general assessment of expected knowledge, an IQ test, and an interview. Applicants for Grammar School study may try a mock exam well in advance.  Candidates with excellent results at the mock exam only then have to sit the interview section of the application process at the given date.

All students have the opportunity to avail themselves of participation in the  Duke of Edinburgh’s International  Award scheme, (the DofE). Amongst the students successful on this scheme are Filip Chalupa and Lukáš Kotlár.

The Primary School
The educational plan of the Primary School is in agreement with the criteria as laid down by the Ministry of Education and Sport ČR and contains many guiding principles of the IB Primary Years Programme. Pupils are graded more by written comment than by the traditional numerical system.

Fees
The Primary School fees are 195 000 Kč per annum. Annual fees for the Grammar School are 470 000 Kč for boarding students, and 256 000Kč per annum for day students.  Almost half of all students receive some form of financial assistance with their fees from The Kellner Family Foundation. Students with exceptionally high academic results are eligible for, and encouraged to apply for academic scholarship stipend.

Thanks to grants from The Kellner Family Foundation, hundreds of students have studied or continue to study at Open Gate School. To date, 442 students have benefited from grants exceeding a total of CZK 615 million.

References

External links

Official website of Kellner Family Foundation

Grammar schools
Boarding schools in the Czech Republic
Educational institutions established in 2005
Elementary and primary schools in the Czech Republic
Schools in Prague
2005 establishments in the Czech Republic